Hampa (also Romanized as Hampā and Hompā) is a village in Chaman Rural District, Takht-e Soleyman District, Takab County, West Azerbaijan Province, Iran. At the 2006 census, its population was 384, in 88 families. This village is populated by Azerbaijani Turks.

References 

Populated places in Takab County